Ivan Lendl won in the final 6–0, 6–2, 6–4 against Yannick Noah.

Players

Draw

Finals

Group A

Group B

References

Toronto Molson Light Challenge
Tennis tournaments in Canada
Toronto Molson Light Challenge
Toronto Molson Light Challenge
Tennis in Ontario